The Winner B150 is a Belgian helicopter that was designed and produced by Winner SBS of Dinant. Now out of production, when it was available the aircraft was supplied complete and ready-to-fly-aircraft or as a kit for amateur construction.

Design and development
The B150 was designed to comply with the French CNSK rules. It features a single main rotor and tail rotor, a two-seats-in side-by-side configuration enclosed cockpit with a bubble windshield, skid landing gear and a  Solar T62T-32 turboshaft engine.

The aircraft fuselage is made from aluminum and composites.

Reviewer Werner Pfaendler, describes the design as providing "easy and fun flying".

Production of the B150 was suspended due to deficiencies in the Solar T62 powerplant. The company said, "it was decided to abandon the Solar T62 turbine; this second-hand power source appeared to be obsolete, difficult to find in a proper condition and with limited performance". Instead the company redesigned the airframe to accept a  piston engine as the B200 and also a  TS100 turboshaft engine as the B250.

Specifications (B150)

See also
List of rotorcraft

References

External links

B150
2010s Belgian civil utility aircraft
2010s Belgian helicopters
Homebuilt aircraft